The Ultralite Soaring Wizard is an American ultralight aircraft that was designed and produced by Ultralite Soaring Inc. The aircraft was supplied as a kit for amateur construction.

Design and development
It features a cable-braced high-wing, a single-seat, open cockpit, tricycle landing gear and a single engine in pusher configuration. It differs from the Quicksilver primarily in the configuration of the tail boom tubes and the use of drooped wing tips.

The Wizard is made from bolted-together aluminum tubing, with its flying surfaces covered in Dacron sailcloth. Its single-surface  span wing has its cabling supported by a single tube style kingpost. The landing gear uses tube flexing for suspension and features a fixed nose wheel. On the early models the pilot is accommodated on a sling seat suspended from the main wing keel tube, to allow weight-shift control.

The Wizard was commercially successful and a large number were completed and flown. Construction time from the supplied assembly kit is about 100 hours.

Variants
Wizard W1
Initial model with a weight-shift control system and no aerodynamic controls.
Wizard J2
Improved model with a hybrid control system, utilizing weight-shift plus spoilers for roll control and an elevator for pitch control.
Wizard J-3
Three axis control version with elevator, rudder and spoilers. Standard powerplant supplied was the Kawasaki 440 snowmobile engine producing . This model introduced a fixed seat, steerable nose wheel and brakes. Empty weight , gross weight . Very similar to the Eipper Quicksilver MX.
Wizard J-3 Magnum
Three axis control version with elevator, rudder and ailerons. Standard powerplant supplied was the Kawasaki 440 snowmobile engine producing .
Wizard T3
Two seat model.

Aircraft on display
Museo del Aire, Madrid, Spain - T3 two seat model

Specifications (Wizard W1)

See also
Laron Wizard, a different aircraft with the same model name

References

External links
Photo of a Wizard W1 in flight
Photo of a Wizard T3 in the Museo de Aeronautica Y Astronautica

1970s United States ultralight aircraft
Homebuilt aircraft
Single-engined pusher aircraft